Mashonaland East, informally Mash East, is a province of Zimbabwe. It has an area of 32,230 km2 and a population of approximately 1.35 million (2012). Marondera is the capital of the province.

Geography

Districts 
Mashonaland East is divided into nine districts:

 Chikomba
 Goromonzi
 Marondera
 Mudzi
 Murehwa (Mrehwa)
 Mutoko
 Seke
 Uzumba-Maramba-Pfungwe (UMP)
 Wedza (Hwedza)

Education

See also
 Provinces of Zimbabwe
 Districts of Zimbabwe

Notes

External links
 

 
Provinces of Zimbabwe